Flight Lieutenant Stanley Gilbert Pickard DFM (25 December 1913 – 1995) was a Royal Air Force pilot active in World War II. He was awarded the Distinguished Flying Medal.

Pickard was promoted from Flight Sergeant to Pilot Officer on probation (emergency) on 24 
March 1943, to Flying Officer on probation (war subs.) on 24 September 1943 and to Flight Lieutenant (war subs.) on 25 March 1945.

References 

Recipients of the Distinguished Flying Medal
Royal Air Force officers
1913 births
1995 deaths
Date of death missing